Gary Barret Browning (born December 28, 1984) is an American former professional baseball pitcher who played in Major League Baseball (MLB) for the St. Louis Cardinals in 2012.

Amateur career
Browning attended Florida State University, and in 2005 he played collegiate summer baseball with the Cotuit Kettleers of the Cape Cod Baseball League.

Professional career
He was selected by the Los Angeles Angels of Anaheim in the 28th round of the 2006 Major League Baseball Draft. He was drafted by the Cardinals in the 2011 Rule 5 draft and was called up to the major leagues on June 30, 2012. The Cardinals designated him for assignment on January 28, 2013. He was released on May 24, 2013.

References

External links

1984 births
Living people
Major League Baseball pitchers
Baseball players from Georgia (U.S. state)
People from Brunswick, Georgia
St. Louis Cardinals players
Orem Owlz players
Cedar Rapids Kernels players
Rancho Cucamonga Quakes players
Arkansas Travelers players
Scottsdale Scorpions players
Salt Lake Bees players
Memphis Redbirds players
Águilas Cibaeñas players
American expatriate baseball players in the Dominican Republic
Middle Georgia Warriors baseball players
Florida State Seminoles baseball players
Cotuit Kettleers players